Bagh Bondi Khela (English: The Caged Tiger Game) is a 1975 Indian Bengali-language thriller drama film directed by Pijush Bose and produced by Asima Bhattacharya who also produced the iconic film Chowrangee in 1968. This film based on a novel of Prafulla Roy. The film starring Uttam Kumar, Supriya Devi, Partha Mukherjee and Mahua Roy Chowdhury in lead. This movie is believed to be Uttam Kumar’s best appearance as an antagonist.

Plot
Bhabesh Banerjee is a corrupt and loose character. He lives in Ranipur, involved with unauthorised business, smuggling and immoral trafficking. His son Rajesh is an honest man who loves Dolon. Bhabesh cheated Dolon's father using counterfeit documents. When Rajesh comes to visit his father, Bhabesh gifts all his properties to Rajesh for getting political mileage and enters into politics. Bhabesh's second wife Bibha knows the whole plot and reveals it to Rajesh. When police come to arrest Bhabesh, he(Bhabesh) commits suicide.

Cast
Uttam Kumar as Bhabesh Banerjee
Supriya Chowdhury as Bibha
Partho Mukherjee as Rajesh
Mahua Roychoudhury as Dolon
Asit Baran as Dolon's father
Samita Biswas as Bhabesh's first wife
Sulata Chowdhury
Kalyani Mondal
Ashim Kumar 
Dilip Bose

Soundtrack

Reception
The film is remembered as Uttam Kumar's most cruelty villain role played ever. His role as an antagonist just shocked everyone. Before this film he also did negative character like Kuhuk in 1960, Aparichit in 1969, Stree in 1972. But this one remember as one of the greatest villain played ever in Bengali Cinema history. 

The film didn't performed well at the box office because audience not want to see their idol Uttam Kumar as cruelty villain. But it's become box office success when it's re released at 1980s.

References

External links
 

1975 films
Bengali-language Indian films
Indian crime thriller films
Indian thriller drama films
Indian crime drama films
1970s thriller drama films
1970s crime thriller films
1975 crime drama films
1970s Bengali-language films
Films based on Indian novels